Alberte Vingum Andersen (born November 14, 2004) is a Danish soccer player who plays goalkeeper for HB Køge in the Elite Division and Denmark national team.

Career

Club team 
She has previously played for the childhood club TPI Fodbold, and later Odense Q, at a higher level.

In September 2021, she signed a contract with the defending Danish champions from HB Køge, where she was to act as second choice for American Kaylan Marckese.  On 29 May 2022, she made her official debut for the first team, in a play-off match in the Gjensidige Kvindeligaen against FC Thy-Thisted Q that ended 5–2 in Køge's favour.

National team 
She has appeared several times for the Danish youth national teams and for the qualification for the U/19 European Championship.

The day after her debut for HB Køge, on 31 May 2022, she was selected for the first time for the senior national team, for an official friendly match against Austria in Wiener Neustadt, included as third choice.

Merits 

 The Elite Division:
 Winner (1): 2022

References 

Living people
2004 births
Danish women's footballers
Denmark international footballers
Denmark women's international footballers
Association football goalkeepers
Women's association football goalkeepers

HB Køge (women) players
Odense Q players
Denmark women's youth international footballers